World Anthem is the fifth studio album by Canadian rock band Mahogany Rush, led by Frank Marino. It was released in 1977 on Columbia Records.

Covers of 3 of the songs on World Anthem, "In My Ways" (George Lynch), "The World Anthem" (James Byrd), and "Try For Freedom" (Ronnie Montrose), appear on the 2005 Secondhand Smoke - A Tribute to Frank Marino album. "World Anthem" is also covered by japanese band X Japan in their second album "Blue Blood".

Track listing 
All songs by Frank Marino.

 "Requiem For A Sinner" - 6:01
 "Hey Little Lover" - 4:51
 "Broken Heart Blues" - 4:55
 "In My Ways" - 6:13
 "The World Anthem" - 3:09
 "Look At Me" - 4:07
 "Lady" - 4:38
 "Try For Freedom" - 11:28

Personnel 
 Frank Marino -  Vocals, Guitar, Synthesizer, Percussion, Timpani
 Paul Harwood - Acoustic & Electric Bass
 Jimmy Ayoub - Drums, Percussion
 Phil Bech - Synthesizer solo on "Lady"

Charts

References 

1977 albums
Mahogany Rush albums
Columbia Records albums